Karim Benyamina (Ar:  كريم بن يمينة; born 18 December 1981) is a former professional footballer who played as a forward. Born in East Germany, he represented the Algeria national team twice internationally.

Club career

Union Berlin
On 26 September 2009, Benyamina scored a goal in a league game against Rot Weiss Ahlen becoming the top scorer in the history of Union Berlin with 78 goals in 161 matches in all competitions.

On 7 April 2011, Benyamina announced that he would be leaving Union Berlin at the end of the season, after being at the club for six years. He is the all-time top scorer in the club's history with 87 goals in all competitions, with his number 22 jersey retired until someone breaks his goal scoring record.

FSV Frankfurt
On 27 May 2011, Benyamina signed a two-year contract with FSV Frankfurt.

International career
On 30 October 2010, Benyamina was called up to the Algeria national team by head coach Abdelhak Benchikha for a friendly against Luxembourg. On 17 November 2010, he made his debut for Algeria as a starter against Luxembourg before being subbed off in the 80th minute. In doing so, he became the first German-born player to play for Algeria.

Personal life
Karim's younger brother Soufian is also a professional footballer, currently playing for SV Wehen Wiesbaden.

Career statistics

References

External links
 
 
 

1981 births
Living people
German people of Algerian descent
German sportspeople of African descent
Algerian footballers
Algeria international footballers
1. FC Union Berlin players
SV Babelsberg 03 players
Berliner AK 07 players
FSV Frankfurt players
Karlsruher SC players
2. Bundesliga players
3. Liga players
Regionalliga players
Association football forwards
FC Viktoria 1889 Berlin players
Footballers from Dresden